Afghanistan is a multiethnic and mostly tribal society. The population of the country consists of numerous ethnolinguistic groups: Pashtun, Tajik, Hazara, Uzbek, Aimaq, Turkmen, Baloch, Pashai, Nuristani, Kurds, Gujjar, Arab, Brahui, Qizilbash, Pamiri, Kyrgyz, Sadat and others. Altogether they make up the Afghan people.

The former Afghan National Anthem and the Afghan Constitution (before 2021) each mention fourteen of them, though the lists are not exactly the same.

National identity 

The term "Afghan" is synonymous with the ethnonym "Pashtun", but in modern times the term became the national identity of the people, who live in Afghanistan.

The national culture of Afghanistan is not uniform, at the same time, the various ethnic groups have no clear boundaries between each other and there is much overlap. Additionally, ethnic groups are not racially homogenous. Ethnic groups in Afghanistan have adopted traditions and celebrations from each other and all share a similar culture. For example, Nauruz is a New Year festival celebrated by various ethnic groups in Afghanistan.

Larger ethnic groups

Pashtuns 

The Pashtuns make up one of the largest ethnic groups in Afghanistan, comprising 37% (2018 sociological research data by The Asia Foundation) of the country's population. According to the Library of Congress Country Studies' estimate of 1996, Pashtuns made up 40% of Afghanistan's population. The majority of Pashtuns practice Sunni Islam. After the rise of the Hotaki dynasty in 1709 and the Durrani Empire in 1747, Pashtuns expanded by forming communities in what is now Afghanistan and Pakistan.

There are conflicting theories about the origin of the Pashtun people, both among historians and the Pashtun themselves. A variety of ancient groups with eponyms similar to Pukhtun have been hypothesized as possible ancestors of modern Pashtuns. The Greek historian Herodotus mentioned a people called Pactyans, living in the Achaemenid's Arachosia Satrap as early as the 1st millennium BC. Since the 3rd century AD and onward they are mostly referred to by the ethnonym "Afghan", a name believed to be given to them by neighboring Persian people. Some believe that ethnic Afghan is an adaptation of the Prakrit ethnonym Avagana, attested in the 6th century CE. It was used to refer to a common legendary ancestor known as "Afghana", asserted to be grandson of King Saul of Israel.

According to scholars such as V. Minorsky and others, the name Afghan appears in the 982 CE Hudud-al-Alam geography book. Al-Biruni referred to a group of Afghans in the 11th century as various tribes living on the western frontier mountains of Ancient India and Persia, which would be the area between the Hindu Kush mountains in Afghanistan and the Indus River in what is now Pakistan. According to other sources, some Pashtuns may be the Lost tribes of Israel who converted to Islam during the Arab Empire. Since the 13th century, some Pashtun tribes conquered areas outside their traditional Pashtun homeland by pushing deeper into South Asia.

The modern Afghan national identity developed in the mid 18th century under the rule of Ahmad Shah Durrani‌, who was the founder of the Durrani Empire.

The Karzai administration, which is led by Hamid Karzai, is dominated by the Pashtun ministers.

Some notable Pashtuns of Afghanistan include: Hamid Karzai, Ashraf Ghani, Nazo Tokhi, Wazir Akbar Khan, Malalai of Maiwand, Abdul Ahad Momand, Zalmay Khalilzad, the Afghan Girl, Hedayat Amin Arsala, Abdul Rahim Wardak, Sher Mohammad Karimi, Abdul Salam Azimi, Zalmai Rassoul, Omar Zakhilwal, Ghulam Farooq Wardak, Anwar ul-Haq Ahady, Daud Shah Saba, Mohammad Gulab Mangal, Gul Agha Sherzai, Asadullah Khalid, Mohammad Hanif Atmar, Mohammad Ishaq Aloko, Mohammed Omar, Gulbuddin Hekmatyar, Nashenas, Ubaidullah Jan, Naghma, Farhad Darya,  Suhaila Seddiqi, Shukria Barakzai and Fauzia Gailani.

Tajik 

Tajiks form the second largest ethnic group in Afghanistan. They are a native Persian-speaking people. As a self-designation, the term Tajik, which earlier on had been more or less pejorative, has become acceptable only during the last several decades, particularly as a result of Soviet administration in Central Asia. Alternative names for the Tajiks are Fārsī (Persian), Fārsīwān (Persian-speaker), and Dīhgān (cf. , literally "farmer or settled villager", in a wider sense "settled" in contrast to "nomadic").

Like the rest of the ethnic groups in Afghanistan, the origin of Tajiks is a mystery. They were only able to rule and at the same time legitimize their rule as second- or even as immediate sub-rulers with some significant influence on the foreigners – with the exception of the short 10-month rule of Habibullah Kalakani in 1929. Tajiks made up 25.3% of Afghanistan's 18.85 millions population in 1996 which was equivalent to 4.77 millions, and the Encyclopædia Britannica explains that by the early 21st century they constituted about one-fifth of the population.

Tajiks are the major ethnic group in neighboring Tajikistan, a country that was created north of Afghanistan in 1991. During the late 19th century and early 20th century, large number of Central Asian Tajiks fled the conquest of their native homeland by Russian Red Army and settled in northern Afghanistan.

In Afghanistan, Tajiks are the majority in the city of Herat. The city of Mazar-e-Sharif is 60% Tajik, the city of Kabul is approximately 45% and the city of Ghazni 50%. Many are known to be in the Afghan National Security Forces (ANSF) while some in the major cities are bureaucrats, doctors, teachers, professors, traders, and shopkeepers. Others live in rural areas, particularly in Badakhshan, and engage in agriculture. Some notable Tajiks from Afghanistan include: Habibullah Kalakani, Burhanuddin Rabbani, Ahmad Shah Massoud, Ahmad Zia Massoud, Mohammed Fahim, Yunus Qanuni, Ismail Khan, Bismillah Khan Mohammadi, Atta Muhammad Nur, Amrullah Saleh, Wasef Bakhtari, Abdul Latif Pedram, Massouda Jalal, Baz Mohammad Ahmadi, Mohammed Daud Daud, Abdul Basir Salangi, and Fawzia Koofi.

Hazara 

The Hazaras are one of the largest ethnic groups in Afghanistan. They reside in all parts of Afghanistan, mainly in the Hazarajat region in central Afghanistan. Linguistically the Hazaras speak a dialect of Dari-Persian, known as Hazaragi, and sometimes their variant is interspersed with many Turkic and a few Mongolic loanwords. They practice Islam, mostly the Shi'a of the Twelver sect, with significant Sunni, some Isma'ili and Non-denominational Muslim minorities. According to Library of Congress Country Studies in 1996, Hazaras made up 18% of country's population.

Some notable Hazaras of Afghanistan include: Abdul Ali Mazari, Commander Shafi Hazara, Ismael Balkhi, Karim Khalili, Sultan Ali Keshtmand, Habiba Sarābi, Sarwar Danish, Muhammad Ibrahim Khan, Sima Samar, Ramazan Bashardost, Abdul Haq Shafaq, Sayed Anwar Rahmati, Qurban Ali Urozgani, Azra Jafari, Ahmad Shah Ramazan, Muhammad Mohaqiq, Ahmad Behzad, Nasrullah Sadiqi Zada Nili, Abbas Noyan, Fahim Hashimy, Rohullah Nikpai, Hamid Rahimi, Mohammad Ebrahim Khedri, Wakil Hussain Allahdad and Dawood Sarkhosh.

Uzbek 

The Uzbeks are the main Turkic people of Afghanistan whose native territory is in the northern regions of the country. Most likely the Uzbeks migrated with a wave of Turkic invaders and intermingled with local Iranian tribes over time to become the ethnic group they are today. The Uzbeks of Afghanistan are Sunni Muslims and fluent in Southern Uzbek language. Uzbeks living in Afghanistan were estimated in the 1990s at approximately 1.3 million but are now believed to be 2 million.

Some notable Uzbeks of Afghanistan include: Abdul Rashid Dostum, Azad Beg, Alhaj Mutalib Baig, Suraya Dalil, Husn Banu Ghazanfar, Delbar Nazari, Abdul Rauf Ibrahimi, Muhammad Yunus Nawandish, Sherkhan Farnood, Abdul Majid Rouzi, Abdul Malik Pahlawan and Rasul Pahlawan.

Aimaq 

Aimaq, meaning "tribe" in Turkic-Mongolic (Oymaq), is not an ethnic denomination, but differentiates semi-nomadic herders and agricultural tribal groups of various ethnic origins including the Hazara, Tajik and Baluch, that were formed in the sixteenth and seventeenth centuries. They live among non-tribal people in the western areas of Badghis, Ghor and Herat provinces. They practice Sunni Islam, speak Aimaq dialect of the Persian close to Dari, and refer to themselves with tribal designations. Population estimates vary widely, from less than 500,000 to around 800,000.

Turkmen 

The Turkmens are a smaller Turkic-speaking ethnic group in Afghanistan. They are Sunni Muslims, and their origins are very similar to that of the Uzbeks. Unlike the Uzbeks, however, the Turkmens are traditionally a nomadic people (though they were forced to abandon this way of life in Turkmenistan itself under Soviet rule). In the 1990s their number was put at around 200,000.

Baloch 

The Baloch people are speakers of the Balochi language who are mostly found in and around the Balochistan region of Afghanistan. In the 1990s their number figure was put at 100,000 but they are around 200,000 today. Mainly pastoral and desert dwellers, the Baloch people of Afghanistan are predominantly Sunni Muslims. Abdul Karim Brahui the former Governor of Nimruz Province, is an ethnic Baloch.

Sadat  

On 13 March 2019, addressing the Sadat gathering at the presidential palace (Arg), President Ashraf Ghani said that he will issue a decree on the inclusion of Sadat ethnic group in new electronic national identity card (e-NIC).

President Ashraf Ghani decreed mentioning 'Sadat tribe' in the electronic national identity on 15 March 2019.

Sayyids of the north are generally located in Balkh and Kunduz; while in the east they can be found in Nangarhar. While most are Sunni Muslims, some in the Bamiyan province are Shi'a Muslims.

Smaller ethnic groups

Pashayi 

The Pashayi are an Indo-Aryan ethnolinguistic group living primarily in eastern Afghanistan. They are mainly concentrated in the northern parts of Laghman and Nangarhar, also parts of Kunar, Kapisa, Parwan, Nuristan, and a bit of Panjshir. Their total population is estimated to be 400,000.

Nuristani 

The Nuristani are an Indo-Iranian people, representing a third independent branch of the Aryan peoples (Indo-Aryan, Iranian and Nuristani), who live in isolated regions of northeastern Afghanistan as well as across the border in the district of Chitral in Pakistan. They speak a variety of Nuristani languages. Better known historically as the Kafirs of what was once known as Kafiristan (land of pagans). In the mid-1890s, after the establishment of the Durand Line when Afghanistan reached an agreement on various frontier areas to the British Empire for a period of time, Emir Abdur Rahman Khan conducted a military campaign in Kafiristan and followed up his conquest with forced conversion of the Kafirs to Islam; the region thenceforth being known as Nuristan, the "Land of Light". Before their conversion, the Nuristanis practiced a form of ancient Hinduism. Non-Muslim religious practices endure in Nuristan today to some degree as folk customs. In their native rural areas, they are often farmers, herders, and dairymen. The population in the 1990s was estimated at 125,000 by some; the Nuristani prefer a figure of 300,000.

The Nuristan region has been a prominent location for war scenes that have led to the death of many indigenous Nuristanis. Nuristan has also received abundance of settlers from the surrounding Afghanistan regions due to the borderline vacant location.

Pamiri 

Pamiris are people who speak the Pamiri languages. Pamiris share close linguistic, cultural and religious ties with the people in Badakhshan Province in Afghanistan, the Sarikoli speakers in Taxkorgan Tajik Autonomous County in Xinjiang Province in China and the Wakhi speakers in Afghanistan and Pakistan. The Pamiri people have their own distinctive styles of dress, which can differentiate one community from the next. The styles of hats are especially varied: one can spot someone from the Wakhan, as opposed to from Ruhshon or Shugnon valleys, based solely on headwear.

Kurds 

The Kurds in Afghanistan came as early as the Mongol invasion, when the Kurds were taken from northwestern Iran into present-day Afghanistan to fight the Mongols, the same reason as the Khorasani Kurds, who were sent to Khorasan to create a defense-line against Turkmen and Uzbek nomads. Kurds have been coming to Afghanistan at different times and lived there. Another large wave of Kurdish migration into Afghanistan was the continuation of their migration from Iranian Kurdistan to greater Khorasan during the Afsharid dynasty. Two main groups formed Nader Shah's army. The first was a group of Shahsevan Turks who were in charge of warfare and combat, and the second was a group of Kurds who served as a backup for Nader's army. Although the majority of Afghan Kurds are descendants from the Kurds brought to fight the Mongols, or the descendants of the Kurds who migrated to Afghanistan, or the descendants of Kurds loyal to Nader Shah, a significant amount came in the 1980s to fight in the Soviet–Afghan War to fight against the Soviets. Afghan Kurds today are mostly assimilated, yet acknowledge that they are Kurds, most of them speak Dari as their first language, and only a few Kurdish speakers exist among them. They follow Sunni Islam and mainly live in the cities of Herat, Ghazni, Mazar-i-Sharif, and Kabul. Their population is about 200,000 people.

Kyrgyz 

The Kyrgyz population of Afghanistan was 1,130 in 2003, all from the eastern Wakhan District in the Badakhshan Province of northeastern Afghanistan. They live a nomadic lifestyle.

Others 
More small groups include the Arabs, Gujjar, Moghol, Ormur, Wakhi, Sindhi, Hindkowan, Punjabi, and others.

Distribution 
Of the major ethnicities, the geographic distribution can be varied. Still, there are generally certain regions where one of the ethnic groups tend to dominate the population. Pashtuns for example are highly concentrated in southern Afghanistan and parts of the east, but nevertheless large minorities exist elsewhere. Tajiks are highly concentrated in the north-east, but also form large communities elsewhere such as in western Afghanistan. Hazaras tend to be mostly concentrated in the wider "Hazarajat" region of central Afghanistan, while Uzbeks are densely populated in the north. Some places are very diverse: the city of Kabul, for example, has been considered a "melting pot" where large populations of the major ethnic groups reside, albeit traditionally with a distinct "Kabuli" identity. The provinces of Ghazni, Kunduz, Kabul and Jowzjan are noted for remarkable ethnic diversity.

Ethnic composition 
The population of Afghanistan was estimated in 2017 at 29.2 million. Of this, 15 million are males and 14.2 million females. About 22% of them are urbanites and the remaining 78% live in rural areas. An additional 3 million or so Afghans are temporarily housed in neighboring Pakistan and Iran, most of whom were born and raised in those two countries. This makes the total Afghan population around 33,332,025, and its current growth rate is 2.34%.

The Afghan government announced that it will begin issuing e-ID cards (e-Tazkiras) in which the ethnicity of each citizen is to be provided in the application. This process is expected to reveal the exact figures about the size and composition of the country's ethnic groups.

While there are no reliable statistics post-2004, an approximate distribution of the ethnic groups is shown in the chart below:

The recent estimate in the above chart is supported by the below recent national opinion polls, which were aimed at knowing how a group of about 804 to 13,943 local residents in Afghanistan felt about the current war, political situation, as well as the economic and social issues affecting their daily lives. Ten surveys were conducted between 2004 and 2018 by the Asia Foundation (a sample is shown in the table below; the survey in 2015 did not contain information on the ethnicity of the participants) and one between 2004 and 2009 by a combined effort of the broadcasting companies NBC News, BBC, and ARD.

See also 

Ethnic violence in Afghanistan
Demographics of Afghanistan

References

External links 
 Enmity Breeds Violence in Afghanistan by Nabi Sahak